Éric Tappy (born 19 May 1931) is a Swiss operatic tenor.

Tappy was born in Lausanne. He studied with Fernando Carpi at the Geneva Conservatory and with Ernst Reichert in Salzburg. He made his concert debut in Strasbourg in 1959 as the Evangelist in the St. Matthew Passion. He made his American debut as Don Ottavio at the San Francisco Opera in 1974. That same year, the tenor first appeared at Covent Garden, in the name part of La clemenza di Tito.

Among his recordings are L'Orfeo (1968), Pelléas et Mélisande (conducted by Armin Jordan, 1979), and Die Zauberflöte (opposite Ileana Cotrubaș as Pamina with Zdzisława Donat as the Queen of Night, conducted by James Levine, 1980). Tappy was also featured in two films by  Jean-Pierre Ponnelle:  L'incoronazione di Poppea (conducted by Nikolaus Harnoncourt, 1979) and La clemenza di Tito (with Tatiana Troyanos and Carol Neblett, 1980).

Tappy was known for his wide range of concert and opera repertoire. He retired in 1982.

References

External links
 Short biography
 
 

1931 births
Living people
20th-century Swiss male opera singers
Swiss operatic tenors
People from Lausanne